Drum Suite is an album by American jazz trombonist, composer and arranger Slide Hampton which was recorded in 1962 and first released on the Epic label.

Reception

Allmusic stated "Overall the music is rewarding and if not quite essential, there are enough exciting moments (whether from the ensembles or the main soloists) to make this a recommended acquisition".

Track listing 
All compositions by Slide Hampton except as indicated
 "Fump" - 5:21
 "Lover" (Richard Rodgers, Lorenz Hart) - 5:09 	
 "Like Someone in Love" (Jimmy Van Heusen, Johnny Burke) - 8:26 	
 "Gallery Groove" - 4:27
 "Our Waltz" (David Rose) - 5:23
 "It's All Right with Me" (Cole Porter) - 3:35
 "Stella by Starlight" (Victor Young, Ned Washington) - 3:14 	
 "The Drum Suite" - 6:55 	
 "Well, You Needn't" (Thelonious Monk) - 5:46 Bonus track on CD reissue 	
 "Sleigh Ride" (Leroy Anderson, Mitchell Parish) - 3:14 Bonus track on CD reissue

Personnel 
Slide Hampton - trombone, arranger
John Bello (tracks 2 & 7-10), Hobart Dotson, Freddie Hubbard (tracks: 5-7),  Willie Thomas (tracks 1, 3, 4 & 8), Richard Williams - trumpet
Benny Jacobs-El - trombone
George Coleman - tenor saxophone
Yusef Lateef - flute, tenor saxophone (tracks 1, 3, 4 & 8)
Jay Cameron - baritone saxophone
Tommy Flanagan - piano
Eddie Khan - bass
Max Roach (tracks 1-8), Vinnie Ruggiero (tracks 7, 9 & 10) - drums

References 

Slide Hampton albums
1962 albums
Epic Records albums
Albums produced by Teo Macero